M.A.C.H. 3 is a shoot 'em up LaserDisc video game developed by Gottlieb and released for US arcades in 1983 under their Mylstar brand. The player controls a high-speed fighter aircraft in one of two missions: either a "Fighter Raid" seen flying forward at low altitude or "Bombing Run" seen in a top-down mode. Video backgrounds from the LaserDisc are overlaid by computer graphics. The title is both a reference to Mach number and is an acronym for "Military Air Command Hunter". It was released in Japan by Taito.

Development
The primary programmers and game designers were Chris Brewer and Fred Darmstadt. The overlaid graphics of the fighter were by Gottlieb's video graphics artist, Jeff Lee. Hardware enabling the graphics overlay on top of the background video was designed by David Pfeiffer. Clay Lacy shot the jet footage.

Reception
In the United States, M.A.C.H. 3 reached the number-one position on RePlay magazine's "Player's Choice" upright arcade cabinet earnings chart in January 1984. On Play Meter'''s "National Play Meter" polls, it was the top-grossing laserdisc game in August and October 1984. It was listed by AMOA among the top five highest-grossing arcade games of 1984.

In Japan, Game Machine listed M.A.C.H. 3 on their March 15, 1984 issue as being the second most-successful upright arcade unit of the month.

See also
 Astron Belt (1983)
 Firefox'' (1984)

References

External links

Arcade video games
1983 video games
Arcade-only video games
Combat flight simulators
LaserDisc video games
Gottlieb video games
Rail shooters
Video games developed in the United States
Single-player video games